Efil (also Romanized as Efīl) is a village in Qeshlaq Rural District of Fandoqlu District, Ahar County, East Azerbaijan province, Iran. At the 2006 census, its population was 1,639 in 376 households. The following census in 2011 counted 1,743 people in 462 households. The latest census in 2016 showed a population of 1,733 people in 502 households; it was the largest village in its rural district. It is quite isolated, with the nearest major airport 116 km away.

Climate

Efil has a continental Mediterranean climate, with average summer high temperatures of 33 °C, and average winter lows of -4 °C. There is a large range of rainfall, with a wet period in April (52.3mm of rain) and a dry period in August (2.5mm of rain).

References 

Ahar County

Populated places in East Azerbaijan Province

Populated places in Ahar County